Cool is a studio album by American keyboardist George Duke. The album reached No. 10 on the Billboard Top Contemporary Jazz Albums chart and No. 11 on the Billboard Top Jazz Albums chart.

Overview
Artists such as Flora Purim, Howard Hewett, Everette Harp, Philip Bailey, Paul Jackson Jr., Lynn Davis, Josie James, and Robert Brookins appeared upon the album.

Critical reception

The album was Grammy nominated in the category of Best Traditional R&B Vocal Album.

Tracklisting

References

2000 albums
George Duke albums
albums produced by George Duke
Jazz-funk albums
Warner Records albums